Breakfast with the Nikolides is a 1942 novel by the British writer Rumer Godden. Like much of her work the story takes place in British India, where she lived for many years.

Synopsis
After a decade apart, while she has been working in Paris and bringing up the children, a couple are reunited in India during the Second World War. They continue to quarrel as she wants to leave India while he is deeply committed to it.

References

Bibliography
 Lassner, Phyllis. Colonial Strangers: Women Writing the End of the British Empire. Rutgers University Press, 2004.
 Le-Guilcher, Lucy. Rumer Godden: International and Intermodern Storyteller. Routledge, 2016.

1942 British novels
Novels by Rumer Godden
Novels set in British India
Peter Davies books